Spin One is a four-track EP released by Australian rock/synthpop  band Icehouse in June 1993. It was issued by Massive Records. Three tracks, "Shakin' the Cage", "Dedicated to Glam" and "MLK", are also on the double CD remix album, Full Circle, released in December 1994. "Byrralku Dhangudha" is an edited version of "The Great Southern Mix" with guest appearance by aboriginal performers, keyboardist Bernie Worrell (Parliament-Funkadelic) and avant-garde guitarist Buckethead, and was produced by Bill Laswell.

Professional reviews

Allmusic's Kelvin Hayes described "Shakin' the Cage" and "MLK", which were taken from Full Circle, as "Semi-decent lead [followed by] a diabolical attempt at trendy house courtesy of General Dynamics, who uses samples over a vapid synth, an experiment best left to self-destruct in the laboratory". While the other two tracks, "are remixes of versions that are included in the "FC" bracket, which doesn't bode much better but does at least offer more than its sibling".

Track listing
 "Shakin' the Cage" (Andy Qunta, Iva Davies, Robert Kretschmer, Simon Lloyd) – 4:02
 "Byrralku Dhangudha" (Davies) – 5:25
 "Dedicated to Glam" (Davies) – 4:29
 "MLK" (Davies) – 5:33

Songwriters according to Australasian Performing Right Association.

Personnel
Credits:
Icehouse
 Iva Davies – vocals, guitars, keyboards
 Robert Kretschmer – guitars
 Simon Lloyd – saxophone, keyboards, programming
 Andy Qunta – keyboards, piano

Additional musicians
 Buckethead – guitar (track 2)
 Bernie Worrell – keyboards (track 2)

Production work
Cameron Allan – mixer, producer (tracks 1 and 4)
Charles Clouser (aka General Dynamics) – mixer, producer, remixer (tracks 1 and 4)
 Iva Davies – producer
Bill Laswell – mixer, producer (track 2)
808 State – remix (track 3)

All recording and mixing at General Dynamics, Trackdown Studios, Studios 301, FON Studios, Western Boulevard.

Charts

References

1993 EPs
Icehouse (band) albums
albums produced by Bill Laswell